Sabine Bätzing-Lichtenthäler (born 13 February 1975) is a German politician of the Social Democratic Party (SPD) who has been leading her party’s group in the State Parliament of Rhineland-Palatinate since 2021. She is the first woman in this position.

Political career

Member of the German Bundestag, 2002–2014
Bätzing-Lichtenthäler was first elected to be a member of the Bundestag in the 2002 national elections, representing the constituency of Neuwied from 2002 to 2009 and being elected from the land list in 2009. From 2005 until 2009, she served as the German government's commissioner on drug-related issues in the Federal Ministry of Health. Between 2009 and 2013, she was a member of the Finance Committee and the Sports Committee..In addition to her committee assignments, Bätzing-Lichtenthäler was a member of the German-French Parliamentary Friendship Group and of the German-Swiss Parliamentary Friendship Group.

In the negotiations to form a Grand Coalition of Chancellor Angela Merkel's Christian Democrats (CDU together with the Bavarian CSU) and the SPD following the 2013 federal elections, Bätzing was part of the SPD delegation in the working group on financial policy and the national budget, led by Wolfgang Schäuble and Olaf Scholz.

State Minister of Social Affairs, 2014–2021
From 2014 until 2021, Bätzing-Lichtenthäler served as State Minister of Social Affairs, Labour and Health in the government of Minister-President Malu Dreyer of Rhineland-Palatinate. As one of her state's representatives at the Bundesrat, she served on the Committee on Labour, Integration and Social Policy; the Committee on Health; and the Committee on Family and Senior Citizen Affairs.

Since the 2016 state elections, Bätzing-Lichtenthäler has been a member of the State Parliament of Rhineland-Palatinate.

In the coalition talks following the 2017 federal elections, Bätzing-Lichtenthäler was part of the working group on social affairs, led by Karl-Josef Laumann, Barbara Stamm and Andrea Nahles.

Other activities
 ZDF, Member of the Television Board (2005-2014)
 German Red Cross (DRK), Member
 German United Services Trade Union (ver.di), Member

References

External links 
  

1975 births
Living people
People from Altenkirchen
Members of the Bundestag for Rhineland-Palatinate
Female members of the Bundestag
21st-century German women politicians
State ministers of Rhineland-Palatinate
Members of the Bundestag 2013–2017
Members of the Bundestag 2009–2013
Members of the Bundestag 2005–2009
Members of the Bundestag 2002–2005
Members of the Bundestag for the Social Democratic Party of Germany